Terminalia circumalata, is a tree of the family Combretaceae. It is endemic to Western Australia. It is found in the Pilbara region of Western Australia.

References

circumalata
Endemic flora of Western Australia
Trees of Australia
Pilbara
Plants described in 1862
Taxa named by Ferdinand von Mueller